Ewington is an unincorporated community in Clay Township, Decatur County, Indiana.

History
A post office was established at Ewington in 1871, and remained in operation until it was discontinued in 1900.

Geography

References

Unincorporated communities in Decatur County, Indiana
Unincorporated communities in Indiana